State Road 112 (NM 112) is a state highway in the US state of New Mexico. NM 112's southern terminus is at NM 96 north of Regina, and the northern terminus is at U.S. Route 64 (US 64)/ US 84 in Los Ojos.

Major intersections

See also

References

112
Transportation in Rio Arriba County, New Mexico